This is a list of rulers of Saba and Himyar.

Mukarrib (Mukrab, Karab), a religious title that means "near to God", was used by rulers of Saba' until Karib'il Watar changed his title to Malik at the time of the kingdom of Saba' and Dhu Raydan that was established between Himyarites and Sabaeans, both descending from ancient South Arabian patriarch Qahtan. The title Tubba, which means "the one who follows the sun like a shadow" was used by Himyarites to refer to their rulers.

Mukaribs of Saba'

Kings of Saba'

Kings of Saba' & Dhu Raydan

Kings of Saba' & Dhu Raydan & Hadhramaut & Yamnat 2nd Himyarite Kingdom

King of Saba', Dhu Raydan, Hadramawt, Yamnat and their Arabs, on Tawdum (the high plateau) and Tihamat

References

	
Himyarite Kingdom
Sabaeans
Saba and Himyar	
Yemen history-related lists